Khadia beswickii is a species of plant in the family Aizoaceae. It is endemic to South Africa.  Its natural habitat is subtropical or tropical dry lowland grassland. It is threatened by habitat loss.

References

External links
 

Flora of South Africa
Aizoaceae
Critically endangered plants
Taxonomy articles created by Polbot
Taxa named by Louisa Bolus
Taxa named by N. E. Brown